Matthias Dollinger (born 12 September 1979) is an Austrian footballer who currently plays for SV Austria Klagenfurt.

Career
After spending several years in Austria's lower leagues, Dollinger made his Bundesliga debut at 25 years of age for Grazer AK in the 2004–05 season. He subsequently earned a move to Rapid Wien but left the Vienna giants after two seasons to join LASK.

National team statistics

References

1979 births
Living people
Sportspeople from Klagenfurt
Footballers from Carinthia (state)
Austrian footballers
Austria international footballers
FC St. Veit players
SK Rapid Wien players
Grazer AK players
LASK players
SC Schwanenstadt players
Austrian Football Bundesliga players

Association football midfielders